Dark Sector, stylized as darkSector is a third-person shooter video game developed by Digital Extremes for the Xbox 360, PlayStation 3 and Microsoft Windows.

The game is set in the fictional Eastern Bloc country of Lasria, and centers on protagonist Hayden Tenno (voiced by Michael Rosenbaum), a morally ambivalent CIA "clean-up man". While trying to intercept rogue agent named Robert Mezner, Hayden's right arm is infected with the fictional Technocyte virus, which gives him the ability to grow a three-pronged "Glaive" at will.

Dark Sector received mixed reviews for its visual design, originality of action and weapon-based gameplay. Many critics have compared the game to Resident Evil 4 and Gears of War, for their similar style of play and story.

Gameplay

Gameplay of Dark Sector revolves around the use of the Glaive, a tri-blade throwing weapon similar to a boomerang which returns to Hayden after each throw. The Glaive can be used for long-distance combat, solving environmental puzzles, and picking up in-game items. When in close proximity to an enemy, context-sensitive actions may appear, allowing the player to execute enemies with "finishers". Enemies hold onto Hayden while attacking, and the player must rapidly press a randomly prompted button to break free.

Environmental puzzles in the game usually focus upon capturing various elements (fire, electricity, or ice) with the Glaive. For example, a web blocking Hayden's path can be bypassed by capturing fire with the Glaive, and then launching it at the web to burn it down. The Glaive can also be dual-wielded with a gun, which allows the player to perform weapon combos which are more effective against shielded enemies. As the game progresses, Hayden and the Glaive are given several new abilities; it can be guided through the air, being able to kill multiple enemies; a charged-up throw for deadlier attacks; and the ability to make Hayden invisible for a short time and provide a temporary shield.

The camera is positioned over the shoulder for third-person shooting, and the player can take cover by standing next to an object such as a pillar or wall. While in cover, Hayden can move temporarily out of cover to fire and throw the Glaive; however there is no blind firing from behind cover. There is a sprint function, which works similar to Gears of Wars Roadie Run, and melee attacks that allow Hayden to punch or slice nearby enemies. The game has no HUD (except for the ammo counter); Hayden's health is shown by the screen flashing red when he takes damage, as well as an indicator showing the attacker's position. If Hayden takes too much damage, the flash speed will increase, and a heartbeat will be heard, indicating Hayden is "bleeding out".

Money, ammo, weapon upgrades, and grenades can be found in set locations. Downed enemies drop their guns, though after his infection, Hayden can only carry these weapons for a few seconds before they self-destruct. Permanent weapons can be purchased and upgraded in black markets, one small weapon for his off-hand use with the Glaive (replacing the pistol) and one large weapon such as a shotgun or rifle.

Multiplayer
Dark Sector has an online multiplayer mode, where there are two modes of gameplay:
Infection: one player is randomly selected to be Hayden in a deathmatch against many soldier characters.
Epidemic: two Haydens on separate teams, the objective being to kill the opposing team's Hayden first.
In both modes, Hayden will have superior powers compared to the soldiers. Hayden will be able to become invisible, use the Glaive, etc., whereas the soldiers cannot.

Story

Setting and characters
Dark Sector is set in Lasria, a fictional satellite country bordering the Soviet Union. In the prologue, set near the end of the Cold War, the Lasrians discover an American submarine off the coast. After opening it, a mysterious infection called "the Technocyte" breaks loose. In the game's present, the Lasrian military fights against the Technocyte victims, who have largely undergone extreme mutations and have gained frightening abilities.

The player character is Hayden Tenno (voiced by Michael Rosenbaum). An ambivalent CIA agent, he has congenital analgesia, which renders him unable to feel pain. He is supported by Yargo Mensik (voiced by Jürgen Prochnow), a scientist and sleeper agent who knows the origin of the Technocyte virus. The main antagonist, Robert Mezner (voiced by Dwight Schultz), is an ex-CIA agent who seeks to build a utopia by spreading the Technocyte virus across the planet. Supporting Mezner is Nadia (voiced by Julianne Buescher), a mysterious woman whom Hayden knows; and "Nemesis", a metallic, humanoid figure who fights with a long Technocyte blade. Other characters include "the A.D.", Hayden's superior in the CIA; the Blackmarket Dealer, an arms dealer who supplies Hayden with weapons and equipment for his missions. and Viktor Sudek, an ill fated informant captured at the beginning of the game held prisoner at a Lasrian gulag.

Plot

Dark Sector begins with Hayden Tenno infiltrating a gulag compound in Lasria that supposedly holds people infected with the Technocyte virus (which leaves them a mindless mutant with metallic skin). His mission is to find captured informant Viktor Sudek, prevent the spread of the Technocyte virus, and eliminate rogue CIA operative Robert Mezner, the man responsible for gathering the infected into the gulag. Upon finding Viktor, obtaining information of Mezner’s whereabouts, and receiving a cryptic warning about Mezner’s goal, Hayden swiftly executes him as he’s now a loose end and potentially infected. Hayden makes short work of enemy resistance in his mission to find Mezner, all the while  planting C4 charges throughout the building, before encountering a humanoid metal figure called “Nemesis”. Hayden fires an RPG at the creature, only for it to telekinetically deflect it back at him, causing him to leap off the roof to avoid being hit and is knocked unconscious. Waking up hours later, Hayden finds himself face-to-face with Mezner. As the two converse, Mezner chastises Hayden for his blind obedience and divulges info about Hayden’s psychological profile. As Hayden attempts to reach for his gun, Nemesis appears and stabs his right shoulder, transferring the Technocyte virus into Hayden as soon as Mezner gives the order. Mezner tells Hayden that he believes that Hayden deserves to be infected and suffer the effects of the virus. Hayden detonates the C4 charges set earlier and manages to escape.

His right arm now mutated by Technocyte, Hayden arrives at a radio station to contact the A.D., his superior, for further instructions. The A.D. tells Hayden to meet up with their sleeper agent, Yargo Mensik, to obtain boosters for the infection. Shortly after, Hayden is ambushed by soldiers, just as his infected arm produces the Glaive, which he uses to eliminate the hostiles. Hayden moves along the coast, slowly gaining new abilities with the Glaive as the infection progresses; while encountering both haz-mat soldiers and infected civilians. He also hears Mezner taunting him telepathically, saying that "this change is inevitable."

Eventually, Hayden finds Yargo, who gives Hayden his updated orders and a booster for the infection. Hayden refuses the medicine, and learns that Mezner wants to recapture the infected with an old transmitter, which emits a signal that attracts Technocyte-infected creatures to its location, within an old church. Hayden also learns that Nadia, a woman Hayden is acquainted with, is also working for Mezner. Hayden moves on towards the church to destroy the transmitter. He makes it into the church catacombs and finds the transmitter. Nadia, who has a deep-rooted hatred for Hayden after his last meeting with her, confronts him. She leaves him to fight his way through a swarm of infected and escape before the C4 he set goes off.

After making contact with the A.D. again, Hayden learns that Mezner is using a freighter to export the Technocyte virus from Lasria. After getting on the boat and fighting through the crew, he makes it to the cargo hold, accidentally releasing a highly evolved Technocyte monster, which sinks the ship. After Hayden escapes, he learns that Mezner's men have found and captured Yargo. Hayden rushes back to Yargo's post, where he finds a security feed of Nadia torturing Yargo, demanding that he let her into "the Vault", saying that whatever is in there can control the Technocyte virus. Disobeying the A.D.'s orders to stand down and await his arrival, Hayden sets out to rescue Yargo.

Fighting through a train station, Hayden finds Yargo, who has lost an eye during interrogation. After a brief moment of Technocyte-induced pain, Hayden attempts to use the booster, but Yargo starts to warn him about it, just before Nemesis appears. While Yargo escapes, Hayden attempts to take Nemesis head-on, but Mezner arrives and offers Hayden a chance to kill him; however, Mezner has grown powerful enough to mentally control Technocyte creatures, and begins to overpower Hayden. With no other choice, Hayden injects himself with the booster, breaking Mezner's control over him while simultaneously preventing further mutations. Before Hayden passes out, Mezner tells him that he had the same "booster", which was really meant to prepare the two for the Technocyte virus.

Hayden wakes up later in the Vozro Research Facility, where the Technocyte virus was researched during the Cold War. Yargo, who brought him there, tells him that he laced Hayden's booster with "enferon", a chemical lethal to Technocyte creatures. He claims that he was worried that Hayden would "turn out like Mezner", as they both had the same strain of the virus; however, Hayden has retained his humanity, while Mezner did not.

Yargo also tells Hayden that he can get a suit similar to Nemesis' in the facility's subbasement, which can give him a fighting chance against Nemesis. Hayden sends Yargo through the ventilation system, then makes his way down towards the labs where the suit is kept. After killing hordes of Technocyte creatures and bypassing automated security systems, Hayden discovers the suit; but before he puts it on, Nadia arrives. Hayden pleads with her to leave before things get worse than they already are. She says she's already in too deep, and that she will take Yargo to open the Vault, before leaving.

Hayden dons the suit and finally finds and kills Nemesis, learning that it was actually Nadia all along. She apologizes for infecting Hayden and tells him Mezner is planning to transmit the Technocyte virus across Earth. Nadia then tells him that she knows he'll "do the right thing this time", gives him the key to the Vault, then dies.

Hayden works his way to the entrance of the Vault to rendezvous with the A.D., who says he has made a deal with Mezner and gives Hayden a booster "for the road". Outraged from being used and betrayed, Hayden stabs him in the neck with the booster, telling him that he now feels "better than ever", and kills all of the A.D.'s men before heading for the Vault. Finding Yargo, Hayden gives him the key, telling him to seal the Vault and dispose of the key. Inside the Vault, a stunned Hayden discovers the first known source of the Technocyte virus: an American submarine that surfaced off the coast of Lasria (seen in the prologue of the game). Hayden discovers Mezner with the Technocyte transmitter, a Hydra-like monstrosity. After fighting and defeating Mezner, the monster and several infected, Yargo arrives to tell Hayden that the transmission is still going out. Hayden tries to fry the circuitry with his Glaive; but Mezner, not yet dead, stuns his right arm, telling him: "You are one of us now." With his right hand immobilized, Hayden catches the now-electrified Glaive with his left hand, and impales Mezner's skull with it. With the transmission finally halted, the game ends with Hayden leaving the Vault, catching the Glaive as he steps outside. Yargo, who apparently survives, narrates: "That was how it started, the irony of this disease. That in all the others, it made evil; but for him [Hayden], it had saved his soul."

Development
The development of Dark Sector was announced on February 11, 2000, on Digital Extremes' website. The game was originally proposed as a follow up to Digital Extremes and Epic Games' critically acclaimed multiplayer first-person shooter, Unreal Tournament. However, the original plan was scrapped and the game was not spoken of for another four years, during which the game underwent a massive change in focus. The original design had the game keeping in line with its predecessor as a multiplayer arena-style first-person shooter. An in-game cinematic unveiled years later in 2004, gave viewers a brief look at potential storylines and environments, as well as the graphics of the game. Digital Extremes specifically stated that the clips were not pre-rendered and were actual in-game footage. The game was shown as the first example of what a seventh-generation game would look like.

The game was originally intended to take place in a science-fiction environment, in outer space, with players taking the role of a character that inhabits a sleek mechanical suit with incredible powers. The game was officially revealed by Digital Extremes' in late 2005, around the time of the original release of the Xbox 360. In 2006, major overhauls to the game were revealed, showing the main character, and a noticeably less sci-fi setting, although Hayden starts to resemble the originally planned main character as the infection takes over his body. The developers cited a shift in focus by other gaming companies and publishers as the reason for the change to a more modern setting and reducing its sci-fi elements; adding they wanted to achieve the realism that fans would enjoy. Another reason was that the tech demo was originally built before the team knew the maximum specifications of the Xbox 360. An interview with GameSpot revealed that the change in setting was intended to make the main character stand out more, as well as making the story more relatable, which they say has been written as a superhero origin story. He added: "At the beginning of the game when we do the prologue he's just kind of this anti-hero kind of guy. And very simply, concretely in the game, there are certain types of barriers that he has to open with contextual stuff. And then when he changes, then he begins tearing those things off and becomes much more brutal. So what we're trying to do is convey that evolution on the inside, but also convey it on the outside so that those game elements that are around him are evolving as he does."

Dark Sector was based on the Sector Engine, later changed to the Evolution Engine, both Digital Extremes' proprietary game engines. Statements about this being just a name change or a major shift in their technology were not released to the public yet. Dark Sector project lead, Steve Sinclair, stated that the engine was written from scratch. The producer of Dark Sector, Dave Kudirka said when they first built the engine, they did not want it to look like the Unreal Engine 3, and they wanted their own perspective engine. When asked about the games' engine being made on the Wii or PC, he replied "plausible". The game went gold on March 7, 2008. The musical score of the game was composed by Keith Power.

The Windows version of Dark Sector was initially  planned to be released on the same date as on consoles, but later it was dropped and there was no news on its release. On January 19, 2009, some sites reported that a YouTube video showed Dark Sector running on a PC. Later it was confirmed that the game was indeed ported to Windows and was on sale, though only in Russia and the language was Russian by default. Hackers found ways to run the game in English. In early March 2009, Aspyr and Noviy Disk announced the partnership in order to publish Dark Sector for Microsoft Windows, with March 23, 2009 being a targeted release date. Optimized by Noviy Disk for the release, the port featured improved graphics and a redesigned interface that made use of mouse and keyboard controls. An English/French version was added to Steam on March 24, 2009. The PC version's multiplayer mode is only available via Local Area Network play, as the game is a straight port of the console version with no extra code for internet connectivity.

Comic
A comic titled Dark Sector Zero was released with Dark Sector. Set before the game's main events, it delves into the events that led to Lasria's demise.

Reception

Dark Sector received mixed reviews. Aggregating review websites GameRankings and Metacritic gave the Xbox 360 version 73.24% and 72/100, the PlayStation 3 version 73.14% and 72/100 and the PC version 65.22% and 66/100. Hyper'''s Dirk Watch commended the game for "the Glaive and its aftertouch," but he criticised it for its "patchy AI and steep difficulty curve." Greg Howson of The Guardian thought the game was similar to other "Gears of War clones" except for the Glaive mechanic which was entertaining, however "the thrill soon palls, leaving you with a solid yet hardly essential action game."

Ban in Australia
In February, before the release in March 2008, the game was banned by the Office of Film and Literature Classification (OFLC) for sale in Australia. Adam Zweck, the sales and product manager for AFA Interactive, the local distributors of Dark Sector, told GameSpot AU that the game was banned due to its violence, in particular the finishing moves. "Obviously we're disappointed in it [the decision]. We feel there is justification for an appeal. However, we're exploring several avenues at the moment to see what we can do to get the game on Australian shelves." It was later re-released in Australia for the PlayStation 3 on October 9, 2008, but the violence was censored. On July 22, 2009, Dark Sector was released on the cover disc of PC Powerplay, an Australian PC gaming magazine, although this was the heavily censored version of the game. GamesRadar included it in their list of the 100 most overlooked games of its generation.

Possible sequel
When asked about a sequel in 2008, Steven Sinclair of Digital Extremes stated that there was "nothing definitive" planned, but commented that he would "love to do one", and that Dark Sector only scratched the surface of the character and weapon's potential. Digital Extremes eventually developed a free-to-play game, titled Warframe, which borrows heavily from the original Dark Sector concept video and game.

The original concept for Dark Sector was more similar to what Warframe'' is now, but was put in a modern setting with a linear, single-player mode due to the industry landscape at the time.  As such, Warframe is considered a spiritual successor, and has a handful of nods to Dark Sector.'

References

External links

 

2008 video games
Biological weapons in popular culture
Censored video games
Cold War video games
D3 Publisher games
Fiction about mind control
Laboratories in fiction
Multiplayer and single-player video games
Nanotechnology in fiction
PlayStation 3 games
Post-apocalyptic video games
Spy video games
Third-person shooters
Top Cow Productions
Video games about genetic engineering
Video games about viral outbreaks
Video games adapted into comics
Video games developed in Canada
Video games set in 1987
Video games set in a fictional country
Video games set in the Soviet Union
Video games using PhysX
Weapons of mass destruction in fiction
Windows games
Xbox 360 games
Aspyr games